Irish women's football team may refer to:

Association football (soccer)
 Republic of Ireland women's national football team
 Northern Ireland women's national football team
 Notre Dame Fighting Irish women's soccer team, NCAA college team at Notre Dame University, Indiana, United States

International rules football
 Ireland women's international rules football team (playing hybrid of Gaelic and Australian rules football)